Zdeněk Svěrák (born 28 March 1936) is a Czech actor, humorist, playwright and scriptwriter, and one of the most well-known and popular Czech cultural personalities. Since 1968 he has appeared in 32 films.

Career
In 1958, he graduated in Czech language and literature from the Faculty of Education of Charles University in Prague. His work consists of more than 300 musical texts and plays, and he has appeared in 32 feature films. Among his film scripts are the Academy Award-winning Kolya and The Elementary School, both directed by his son Jan Svěrák as well as My Sweet Little Village. With his close friend Ladislav Smoljak and their radio colleague Jiří Šebánek, he created the fictional polymath Jára Cimrman for the radio programme Vinárna U pavouka in 1966. Cimrman was voted The Greatest Czech in 2005, but barred from winning because of being a fictional character. Zdeněk Svěrák also founded a charity organization, Paraple, which focuses on helping paralyzed individuals.

Svěrák has won three Magnesia Litera awards for his writing. In 2004 he won the Readers' Choice award for his book Jaké je to asi v čudu. He went on to win the same award in 2012 for the book Nové povídky. His third Readers' Choice award came in 2014 for Po strništi bos. In 1989, he was a member of the jury at the 39th Berlin International Film Festival.

Filmography

Acting

References

External links

 
 overview of Zdeněk Svěrák comedies
 CRo-Tatinek

1936 births
20th-century Czech dramatists and playwrights
20th-century Czech male actors
20th-century Czech male singers
20th-century Czech poets
21st-century Czech dramatists and playwrights
21st-century Czech male actors
21st-century Czech male singers
21st-century Czech poets
Living people
Male actors from Prague
Charles University alumni
Recipients of Medal of Merit (Czech Republic)
Czech male dramatists and playwrights
Czech male film actors
Czech male poets
Czech male singers
Czech male stage actors
Czech screenwriters
Male screenwriters
Czech theatre directors
Recipients of the Thalia Award